Viewed as an attack on African American Studies, epistmologies of displacement is term coined by Gilbert NMO Morris, in a series of lectures published in The Triptych Papers: Lectures in Post-Colonialism, Creolization and the Epistemologies of Displacement.

In The Triptych Papers, Morris summarises his argument in this way: "The immediate knowledge and experience of a displaced peoples have value which is undisclosed to the dominant culture necessarily, and this knowledge and experience is largely unrecognized, even by the displaced themselves. This is so because the state of being Oriented toward the dominant culture means seeing oneself through a glass darkly, and a true beholding of oneself requires an “espisteme-shattering act of audacity, tenacity or mendacity", of which the displaced one is often incapable.

"In this way", Morris argues, "Orientation - which is the mood and propensity - of the displaced shows its effects. The displaced one, whose Being and cultural yearning is caught in the dominant espistemes, is also trapped, constantly, above, beyond and outside the frequencies of his actual quotidian anthropology. He waits there, longing for something better; something which he cannot define, the origins or legitimacy of which he cannot give a satisfactory account. That is so because the anthropo-stasis in which he is caught, is a turnstile between the locale of displacement and the dominant culture which is supervenient to it; and therefore, that locale exists and persists as an anomaly and a necessary truth of and within the dominant culture, which it cannot observe, acknowledge or advance without losing itself in Creolisation."

The lectures in the Tripych Papers are dedicated to Professor Jeffrey C. Stewart, Morris' former colleague at George Mason University, who asked Morris whether there could be such a thing as 'an economics for blacks', within the terms of the history that African American Studies emphasises? Morris' reply in the Triptych Papers is: "Ultimately, it is a question of ethics. I aim to show what psychological conditions comes before the possibility of an ethics and so an economics, as such".

References

Postcolonialism